Chen Gongbo (Japanese: Chin Kōhaku; October 19, 1892 – June 3, 1946) was a Chinese politician, noted for his role as second (and final) President of the  collaborationist Wang Jingwei regime during World War II.

Biography
Chen Gongbo was born in northern Guangdong, Qing Empire to Hakka peasants originally from Shanghang County, Tingzhou, western Fujian in 1892. His father was an official in the Qing Dynasty administration. As a student at Beijing University, he participated in the May Fourth Movement and studied Marxism under Chen Duxiu. Chen Gongbo was one of the founders of the Chinese Communist Party and a member of its First Congress in Shanghai in July 1921, but left the party the following year. He then moved to the United States, where he obtained a master's degree in Economics at Columbia University in 1925. On his return to China he joined the Kuomintang (KMT) and was named head of the Department of Peasants and Workers under Liao Zhongkai, and was considered a member of the KMT leftist clique together with Wang Jingwei, with whom he developed a close political and personal relationship.  Although he played a significant role in Chiang Kai-shek’s Northern Expedition, he—along with Wang Jingwei—strongly opposed Chiang as Chiang began to exercise dictatorial power. He felt it particularly unfair for Chiang to have replaced Wang in KMT leadership through a military coup in 1926. However, during a period of Chiang-Wang cooperation, he was named Minister of Industry by the Kuomintang government from 1932 to 1936. Some of the fundamental national economic policies he helped set in this period remained in practice under various Chinese political regimes until the 1970s.  As director of the Kuomintang Sichuan branch, he helped organize the evacuation of the Kuomintang government to Chongqing after the start of the Second Sino-Japanese War.

However, he remained politically aloof to Chiang Kai-shek and, after Wang Jingwei broke ranks with the Kuomintang and established the collaborationist Wang Jingwei Government, Chen soon followed despite his initial opposition. Within the new government Chen became the speaker of the Legislative Yuan. After nominal rule over Shanghai was turned over to the Nanjing Nationalist Government by Japan in November 1940, Chen was appointed mayor. In mid-1944, when Wang traveled to Japan for medical treatment, Chen was left in charge as acting president of the Executive Yuan, becoming president of the government upon Wang's death in November 1944.

At the end of World War II Chen fled to Japan and, immediately following Japan's formal surrender on September 9, 1945, China's representative Gen. He Yingqin asked Japan's representative, Gen. Okamura Yasuji, to extradite Chen Gongbo to China for trial for treason. The request was granted by the American occupation forces, and Chen was escorted back to China on October 3. At his trial he defended himself vigorously. As President he insisted that he had refused to cooperate with the Japanese in several significant matters and had acted only because of his loyalty to his friend, Wang Jingwei. Nevertheless, he was convicted of treason and sentenced to death. He took his fate calmly, saying that "soon I will be reunited with Wang Jingwei in the next world". Chen was executed by firing squad at Suzhou, Jiangsu, on June 3, 1946.

References

Sources
 David P. Barrett and Larry N. Shyu, eds.; Chinese Collaboration with Japan, 1932-1945: The Limits of Accommodation Stanford University Press 2001
 John H. Boyle, China and Japan at War, 1937–1945: The Politics of Collaboration (Harvard University Press, 1972).
 James C. Hsiung and Steven I. Levine, eds., China's Bitter Victory: The War with Japan, 1937–1945 (Armonk, N.Y.: M. E. Sharpe, 1992)
 Ch'i Hsi-sheng, Nationalist China at War: Military Defeats and Political Collapse, 1937–1945 (Ann Arbor: University of Michigan Press, 1982).
 Frederick W. Mote, Japanese-Sponsored Governments in China, 1937–1945 (Stanford University Press, 1954).
 Margherita Zanasi, "Chen Gongbo and the Construction of a Modern Nation in 1930s China," in Timothy Brook and Andre Schmid, eds.; Nation Work:  Asian Elites and National Identities (University of Michigan Press, 2000).

External links

  Rulers:Chen Gongbo
 Blog of Kan Chen, son of Chen Gongbo:  https://sites.google.com/site/kanblog8/home
 Papers of Chen Gongbo at the Rare Book and Manuscript Library, Columbia University, New York, NY

1892 births
1946 deaths
20th-century executions by China
Chinese anti-communists
Chinese communists
Chinese politicians of Hakka descent
Columbia Graduate School of Arts and Sciences alumni
Delegates to the 1st National Congress of the Chinese Communist Party
Former Marxists
Executed Chinese collaborators with Imperial Japan
Executed people from Guangdong
Executed politicians
Heads of government who were later imprisoned
Kuomintang collaborators with Imperial Japan
Mayors of Shanghai
Members of the Kuomintang
National University of Peking alumni
People executed by the Republic of China by firing squad
People extradited to China
Politicians from Guangzhou
Presidents of the Republic of China
Republic of China politicians from Guangdong